COSCO Shipping Ports Limited, stylized as COSCO SHIPPING Ports is a Hong Kong listed company and investor in ports. The company is formerly known as COSCO Pacific Limited and was an indirect subsidiary of China Ocean Shipping (Group) Company (COSCO) and now part of its successor, China COSCO Shipping group. It is mainly engaged in container terminal operations, container manufacturing and leasing, shipping agency and freight forwarding.

COSCO Pacific was a Hang Seng Index constituent (blue chip) from 2003 to 2014. COSCO Pacific also a red chip company so that it once considered as a purple chip company.

History

COSCO Pacific Limited is a Bermuda incorporated company and was a subsidiary of China Ocean Shipping (Group) Company (COSCO). In 1994, it became a listed company in the Stock Exchange of Hong Kong (SEHK). At that time, Hong Kong is a British colony and not yet handover back to the People's Republic of China. After the 1997 handover, Hong Kong still has a separate jurisdiction apart from the Mainland China. Since COSCO Pacific was incorporated in Hong Kong but indirectly controlled by the Chinese government, the company is considered as a red chip.

COSCO Pacific, partnered with Hongkong International Terminals, operates the Terminal 8 (East) of Kwai Tsing Container Terminals since 1991. Hong Kong was once busiest container port in which Kwai Tsing Terminals is the main container port of the city.

From 1997 to 2007, COSCO Pacific was a minority shareholder (20%) of Liu Chong Hing Bank. From 2007 the stake was owned by COSCO Pacific's parent company, COSCO HK.

In 2003, COSCO Pacific is a co-investor of a phase of Qingdao Qianwan Container Terminal, for 20% shares of the SPV that carry the actual investment. In the same year, COSCO Pacific also formed a joint venture with PSA.

In 2008, COSCO Pacific made a bid for a 35-year concession to operate the container port of Piraeus. In 2016, COSCO Pacific's intermediate parent company, China COSCO Holdings, announced to make a bid of the ownership of the port.

In March 2016, COSCO Pacific's joint venture, COSCO-PSA Terminal, announced to expand the shipping terminal at Pasir Panjang, Singapore.

In July 2016, COSCO Pacific announced it plans to change its name to COSCO Shipping Ports Limited. The decision is linked to a merger and major reorganization of China Shipping Group and COSCO Group earlier in 2016.

Shareholders
COSCO Shipping Ports is a listed company. As of November 2020, the market capitalization is HK$17 billion (Not yet free-float adjusted).

, fellow listed company COSCO Shipping Holdings is the parent company of COSCO Shipping Ports. COSCO Shipping Holdings (via subsidiaries "COSCO Investments" and "China COSCO (Hong Kong)") owns 47.26% shares of COSCO Shipping Ports. COSCO Shipping Holdings is in turn parented by China Ocean Shipping Company (COSCO) and ultimately, China COSCO Shipping (COSCO Shipping). COSCO Shipping is one of the entity that was supervised by the State-owned Assets Supervision and Administration Commission (SASAC) of the State Council, making COSCO Shipping Ports qualifies for one of the criteria of red chip (another criterion is incorporated outside Mainland China, which COSCO Shipping Ports does).

COSCO Shipping Ports was a former constituents of Hang Seng Index, the blue chip index, until 2014, as well as Hang Seng China-Affiliated Corporations Index, formerly an index for notable red chips, until September 2020.

References

External links
 

Companies listed on the Hong Kong Stock Exchange
Shipping companies of China
Port operating companies
Former companies in the Hang Seng Index
COSCO Shipping